Brieulles-sur-Meuse (literally Brieulles on Meuse) is a commune in the Meuse department in Grand Est in northeastern France.

Population

See also
Communes of the Meuse department

References

Communes of Meuse (department)